Echeta is a genus of moths in the family Erebidae. The genus was erected by Gottlieb August Wilhelm Herrich-Schäffer in 1855.

Species

 Echeta brunneireta Dognin, 1906
 Echeta divisa Herrich-Schäffer, 1855
 Echeta excavata Schaus, 1910
 Echeta grandis Druce, 1883
 Echeta juno Schaus, 1892
 Echeta milesi Rothschild, 1922
 Echeta minerva Schaus, 1915
 Echeta pandiona Stoll, 1782
 Echeta rhodocyma Hampson, 1909
 Echeta rubrireta Dognin, 1906
 Echeta semirosea Walker, 1865
 Echeta subtruncata Rothschild, 1909
 Echeta trinotata Reich, 1933

References

External links

Phaegopterina
Moth genera